Pender Harbour is a harbour community on British Columbia's Sunshine Coast, on the east side of Malaspina Strait. The harbour itself is an intricate amalgam of bays and coves that encroach inland for five kilometres and provide over 60 kilometres of shoreline. Once a steamer stop, a fishing village, and an important logging and medical waypoint, it is now an unincorporated community within the Sunshine Coast Regional District (SCRD).

Pender Harbour's population is under 3,000, with over 40% of property owners being non-resident (one of them Joni Mitchell, since the early 1970s). It includes the small villages of Madeira Park, Garden Bay, Irvine's Landing, and Kleindale.

Tourism is an important part of the local economy. The area has an arts community and several annual music festivals. It hosts the second-oldest May Day celebration in British Columbia  and the biggest and longest-running downhill longboard race in Canada, Attack of Danger Bay.

Name origin
Pender Harbour was named in 1860 by Captain G.H. Richards, RN, in honour of Daniel Pender, RN ( - 1891). Pender arrived on the coast as second master of the survey vessel Plumper on 9 November 1857. He later served as master of the Plumper and the Hecate, and commander of the Beaver (hired from the Hudson's Bay Company for hydrographic work) from 1863-70. He was subsequently an assistant at the Hydrographic Office in London from 1871-84.

History
Before the first Europeans discovered the area, a vibrant population of First Nations equaled or doubled its current number of inhabitants. Sex'wamin, the Shishalh winter settlement centred on Garden Bay, was likely one of the largest on the British Columbia coast. It is estimated that over 5,000 First Nations people lived in longhouses on the shore near where the Garden Bay Hotel now sits. The Shishalh vacated Pender Harbour and relocated to summer villages up the inlets of Jervis, Salmon, and Narrow. Theirs was the opposite of current migration patterns, which see Pender Harbour's population swell in the summer and thin during the winter.

See also
Francis Point Provincial Park

References

Pender Harbour & District Chamber of Commerce

Populated places in the Sunshine Coast Regional District
Unincorporated settlements in British Columbia
Marinas in Canada
Transport buildings and structures in British Columbia